Diloma nanum is a species of sea snail, a marine gastropod mollusk in the family Trochidae, the top snails.

Description
The small, solid, brown shell has an oval-round shape with a diameter of 5 mm. It contains four convex, very distinct whorls. The apex is simple. The light-colored base of the shell is rounded and hardly perforated. The umbilicus is rather large and plicate-crenulate. The arcuate columella is denticulate. The inner lip is undulate. The throat is livid.

Distribution
This marine species occurs off the Ryukyu Islands

References

External links
 To Encyclopedia of Life
 To World Register of Marine Species

nanum
Gastropods described in 1861